The Image Book is a 2018 Swiss avant-garde essay film directed by Jean-Luc Godard. Initially titled Tentative de bleu and Image et parole, in December 2016 Wild Bunch co-chief Vincent Maraval stated that Godard had been shooting the film for almost two years "in various Arab countries, including Tunisia" and that it is an examination of the modern Arabic world. Godard told Séance magazine that he was shooting without actors but the film would have a storyteller. It was selected to compete for the Palme d'Or at the 2018 Cannes Film Festival. The film was positively received by film critics. It was the final film directed by Godard before his death in 2022.

Synopsis
In line with the rest of Godard's late-period oeuvre, The Image Book is composed of a series of films, paintings and pieces of music tied together with narration and additional original footage by Godard and Anne-Marie Miéville. Similar to his earlier series Histoire(s) du cinéma (and sometimes using some of the exact same film quotes), the film examines the history of cinema and its inability to recognise the atrocities of the 20th and 21st centuries (specifically the Holocaust, ISIS and the Israeli–Palestinian conflict), the responsibilities of the filmmaker and the advances in political discourse with the introduction of consumer-grade digital cameras and iPhones.

Release

The Image Book premiered on 11 May 2018 at the Cannes Film Festival. Although it did not win the official prize, the jury awarded it the first "Special Palme d'Or" in the festival's history. According to Godard, the film is intended to be shown on TV screens with speakers at a distance, in small spaces rather than in regular cinemas. It was shown in this way during its first run at the Théâtre Vidy-Lausanne in November 2018.

The film was released on Blu-ray by Kino Lorber in the United States on May 21, 2019.

Reception
The critics' consensus on it being stated as, "Potentially insurmountable for viewers not attuned to the director's wavelength, The Image Book is typically confounding - and ultimately rewarding - late-period Godard." It also holds a 76/100 on Metacritic. It was named the best film of 2019 by Cahiers du cinéma.

Richard Brody of The New Yorker gave high praise to the film, seeing it as "a sort of epilogue or sequel" to Godard's earlier work Histoire(s) du cinéma, and stated that the film centers around one theme: "the inadequate depiction of what he calls 'the Arab world' and, in particular, the dearth of iconic movie images from the Middle East—which he presents as a failure of the cinema itself, as well as of the world at large." For Bilge Ebiri, film critic for The Village Voice, the film was engaging in its editing of footage taken from varying sources, but Ebiri also shared an initial bafflement toward the film and the meaning of its chosen imagery until he conversed with Egyptian critic Joseph Fahim; Fahim shared to Ebiri that with the film's informed use of images from Middle Eastern cinema, Godard was attempting to deconstruct the Western narrative given to Arab societies and the Western influence on how cinema's history is recorded. Fahim added that "The images introduced by Godard in here are unknown to most Western critics who waxed poetic about the film."

References

External links

2018 films
2010s avant-garde and experimental films
Collage film
Films directed by Jean-Luc Godard
French documentary films
Swiss documentary films
Works about the Middle East
2010s French films